Langley Park is an unincorporated area and census-designated place (CDP) in Prince George's County, Maryland, United States. It is located inside the Capital Beltway, on the northwest edge of Prince George's County, bordering Montgomery County. Per the 2020 census, the population was 20,126.

History

"Langley Park" refers to the Langley Park estate established in 1923 by the McCormick-Goodhart family in the Chillum District of Prince George's County. The name McCormick-Goodhart represented the linking of one of Chicago's oldest families, that of Cyrus McCormick, with that of British barrister Frederick E. McCormick-Goodhart. Frederick's wife Henrietta (Nettie) was the daughter of Leander J. McCormick, a brother of Cyrus. They named the  estate "Langley Park" after the Goodharts' ancestral home in Kent, England. It remains a community landmark at 8151 15th Ave. CASA of Maryland purchased the property in 2009, making the site its home base, and a  Multicultural Community Center is now open in the mansion. This property was listed on the National Register of Historic Places on August 29, 2008.

During the late 1930s-early 1940s, Leander McCormick-Goodhart, son of Frederick and Nettie, served as personal assistant to Ambassador Lord Lothian and supervisor of American Relief to Great Britain through the British embassy.  As a result, the Langley Park estate became a regular site of social activities related to the British embassy including hosting the regular games of the Washington Cricket Club and, in June 1941, a British Relief Country Fair.

The estate was first subdivided during and immediately after World War II, and was developed as a planned community by Pierre Ghent & Associates of Washington, D.C.  The last major section would be developed in 1963. Because of the wartime and immediate postwar demand for housing, the  estate was quickly developed for low-rise apartment homes, semi-detached, and single family homes. Starting in 1949, a 1,542 garden apartment complex, Langley Park Apartments, now located along 14th Avenue, was built to house the exploding postwar population. That same year, M.T. Broyhill and Sons started building on a  tract for 600 single family homes to be priced at around $10,000. These homes now lie north of Merrimac Drive. Both the apartments and homes were completed and occupied by June 1951.

In 1963, the last major segment of the Langley Park estate opened for development.  It was a  parcel located directly around the manor house.  It had been acquired in 1947 from the McCormick-Goodhart family by the Eudist Order for use as a seminary.  The property was acquired for $900,000 by developers, who built the 400-unit Willowbrook Apartments on the site and opened them the following year.  The mansion then operated until the early 1990s as Willowbrook Montessori School.

The Langley Park Elementary School, now known as Langley Park-McCormick School, opened in 1950, at 15th Avenue and Merrimac Drive. In 1988, Leander McCormick-Goodhart, real estate developer and descendant of the estate owners, sent the school a $10,000 donation after receiving an invitation to attend a school event.  That same year, 60 percent of the school population of 610 students was foreign born from 45 different countries and spoke 27 languages.

In 1955, Langley Park was "the fastest growing trade area in Metropolitan Washington", with 200,000 people located within a  radius. Affordable housing attracted a community consisting mostly of young couples with families. In the following decades, Langley Park became a white middle-class enclave that was mostly Jewish. By the 1960s, the Jewish community of Langley Park had already begun to decline.
During the 1970s, after desegregation, increasing numbers of African Americans moved into the community. Although some established families remained, the white population declined due to white flight to the outer suburbs. In 1970, the first language of 6.1 percent was Spanish; by 1980 that number had climbed to 13.4 percent. During the 1980s, Hispanic and Caribbean immigrants from countries such as El Salvador, Mexico, Guatemala, Colombia, Bolivia, Peru, Jamaica and elsewhere in the West Indies led a new wave of migration into the community. In addition, Asian and African immigrants from places like Vietnam, India, Ethiopia and Nigeria settled into the area. It proved to be an attractive locale for immigrants due to the availability of affordable housing that could also accommodate families. The integration of these new groups into Langley Park reflected a larger trend of increased migration to the Greater Washington area during the 1980s and 1990s. By 1990, the area was 40 percent Hispanic.

At the same time, the area suffered through a period of physical decline and increases in crime. During the 1980s, the community struggled with blighted residential and commercial areas. The apartment complexes experienced substantial turnover in occupancy. Residents in the 14th Avenue and Kanawha Street area in particular were subjected to "open air drug markets" and other criminal activity. Long-time residents and the new immigrant communities were both victims of crime. Some homeowners organized to address neighborhood concerns about rising crime. For the 1988–89 school year, bus service for children who lived in walking distance to school was implemented to ensure their safety. Police also increased their presence in the community. Apartment complexes, under new management, initiated safety measures to discourage drug activity such as installing new lighting, security doors and maintaining general upkeep of their properties. At the same time, police in Prince George's County conducted multiple raids in an effort to shut down drug activity in the county.  By 1991, officials were taking note of an increase in illegal immigrants from Central America, and day laborers were beginning to become a common sight on area streets.

Geography
The community is bordered by University Boulevard to the south, the Northwest Branch Anacostia River to the north, Phelps Road to the east, and the Prince Georges County–Montgomery County line to the west. An extremely small stretch of Piney Branch Road (MD 320) which goes into Prince George's County, goes into the Langley Park neighborhood as well, just before it crosses the Northwest Branch Anacostia River and intersects New Hampshire Avenue (MD 650). While most of the Langley Park neighborhood contains the Hyattsville ZIP Code of 20783, there is a small portion of Langley Park located west of New Hampshire Avenue (MD 650), but east of the Prince George's County–Montgomery County line, which contains the Silver Spring ZIP Code of 20903. Langley Park is surrounded by the communities of Adelphi, Silver Spring, Takoma Park, Carole Highlands, and Lewisdale.

Demographics

2020 census

Note: the US Census treats Hispanic/Latino as an ethnic category. This table excludes Latinos from the racial categories and assigns them to a separate category. Hispanics/Latinos can be of any race.

2010 Census
As of the census of 2010, there were 18,755 people, 5,082 households, and 3,375 families residing in the area. The population density was 18,682.8 persons per square mile.

 26.0% White
 16.4% African American
 2.6% Native American
 2.9% Asian
 0.5% Pacific Islander
 43.6 from some other races
 7.9% from two or more races

76.6% of the population is Hispanic or Latino of any race (note that this includes a combination of Hispanics from all different parts of Latin America).

There were 5,082 households, out of which 32.5% had children under the age of 18 living with them, 33.1% were married couples living together, 14.9% had a female householder with no husband present, and 33.6% were non-families. 18.0% of all households were made up of individuals, and 2.7% had someone living alone who was 65 years of age or older. The average household size was 3.67, and the average family size was 3.69.

In the community the population was spread out, with 21.7% under the age of 18, 15.4% from 18 to 24, 43.6% from 25 to 44, 15.4% from 45 to 64, and 3.9% who were 65 years of age or older. The median age was 29.4 years. For every 100 females, there were 152.1 males. For every 100 females age 18 and over, there were 166.8 males.

2000 Census
At the 2000 census, the median income for a household in the community was $37,939, and the median income for a family was $36,018. Males had a median income of $22,356 versus $21,931 for females. The per capita income for the community was $12,733. About 11.3% of families and 16.8% of the population were below the poverty line, including 21.4% of those under age 18 and 6.7% of those age 65 or over.  A 2011 news article noted that "About one in five residents ... lives below the poverty level...."

In 2000, 21.48% of Langley Park residents identified as being of Salvadoran heritage. This was the largest percentage of Salvadoran Americans of any place in the United States. Over the last couple of years, there have also been growing communities of Guatemalans, Puerto Ricans, Nicaraguans and Mexicans.

Government and infrastructure
The Chillum-Adelphi Volunteer Fire Department (CAVFD) serves Langley Park. The station is in Langley Park CDP and has an Adelphi postal address. In March 1951 and June 8, 1951 the CAVFD was established and chartered, respectively. From November and March 1953 the fire station on Riggs Road was constructed; the County Volunteer Firemen's Association designated it Station No. 34. Portions of Station No. 34 were rebuilt in the early 1960s, and it was rededicated on November 16, 1963. In 1962 the CAVFD began building a substation, No. 44, which was dedicated on November 16, 1963, but in 1992 it sold the substation to the county government.

Prince George’s County Police Department's District 1 serves Langley Park; its station is in Hyattsville.

The United States Postal Service Langley Park Post Office is physically in the City of Takoma Park and has a Hyattsville postal address.

Transportation
Two light rail stations on the Purple Line are being constructed to serve Langley Park. One station will be at New Hampshire Avenue and University Boulevard, which was named one of the most dangerous intersections in Maryland for pedestrians to cross. The danger is due to crossings of these six-lane routes mid-block at curbside bus stops. The other station will be located at University Boulevard and Riggs Road. The Purple Line, which will connect to the Washington Metro, Amtrak and MARC, is under construction as of 2022 and is scheduled to open in 2026.

Economy
Langley Park is probably best known as a center of commercial activity in northwestern Prince George's County. At each of the two corners of the New Hampshire Avenue / University Boulevard intersection is a large strip shopping center. One is known as the Langley Park Plaza (northeast corner), while the other is known as the Langley Park Shopping Center (northwest corner). There are also three other small shopping centers a few blocks east of New Hampshire Avenue, two are located on the northeast and northwest sides of the intersection of University Boulevard and Riggs Road, while the third one is located at the intersection of University Boulevard and 15th Avenue.

 Langley Park Plaza is the main shopping center that serves the Langley Park neighborhood. It was once the second largest strip mall in Maryland. Plans were originally announced in 1951 for development of the  site to include 40 stores and a six- to eight-story office building. The site remained undeveloped until 1954, when the Washington, D.C.-based department store Lansburgh's announced plans to open a three-story, $2 million store.  It was the first major department store opened in Prince George's County.  Through the demise of the Lansburgh's chain in 1973, it would remain its most profitable store.  At the store's opening in October 1955, in addition to substantial displays and a payroll of 350, it contained the "Hampshire Room" — a luncheonette seating 90 and a community room to hold about 200. The remainder of the plaza opened shortly thereafter and included a Giant Food store, which opened in December, 1955 and Peoples Drug store.  After Lansburgh's closed in 1973, it was occupied by E. J. Korvette, then Klein's, followed by K-Mart from 1981 to 1996, and Toys "R" Us from November 1996 to January 31, 2007. The Toys "R" Us moved here from a smaller location it originally operated a few blocks east of Langley Park, in the  adjacent neighborhood of Lewisdale. A Value Village Thrift store has occupied its former space in Lewisdale ever since Toys "R" Us closed there and moved to the Langley Park Plaza. Eventually when Toys "R" Us closed its store in the Langley Park Plaza, its spot remained vacant for a little over 2 years, until a Regency Furniture store opened in late June/ July 2009.  Regency Furniture has been operating and still continues to operate in that spot inside Langley Park Plaza today. The Giant Food store closed around the summer of 1997 (which was considered to be part of the 1998 Fiscal Year in Giant Food's 1998 Fiscal Year Annual Report/10-K Statement), and remained vacant for nearly a year until Atlantic Supermarket opened  and took over its former spot inside Langley Park Plaza on May 13, 1998 Atlantic Supermarket, Atlantic Supermarket has been and is still currently operating in Giant's former space ever since it closed. Most of the 1950s pre-neon signs and frozen food/ grocery aisles inside the store still remain from the Giant Food Store. Atlantic Supermarket's originally operated as a very compact supermarket with its logo being in the form of a very simple recantgular white border frame design with a red rectangle contained inside it with the words, "Atlantic Supermarket" in white print. However; Atlantic Supermarket did go through a grocery store expansion (approved by both Prince George's County and the State of Maryland in November, 2005), but which then took place between the fall of 2006 and spring of 2007, to not only increase the size of its store, but also make its store much more modernized so that it could significantly expand its produce offerings.  As a result, Atlantic Supermarket had the front side of its store expanded and remodeled its front store entrance with a more advanced store logo with a castle like red triangular design with a white rectangle in between with the words, "Atlantic Supermarket" in lavender print. Atlantic Supermarket's front side expansion, which took place between late 2006 and early 2007,  displaced a total of twelve parking lot spaces that used to be in front of the store. Also, a McDonald's Fast Food Restaurant opened right inside the portion of the parking lot inside the Langley Park Plaza, right at the edge of the intersection of New Hampshire Avenue (MD 650) & University Boukevard East (MD 193), around the spring of 1998. The McDonald's Fast Food Restaurant inside the Langley Park Plaza parking lot, displaced several of its formerly available parking spaces there, as there was no building originally on the site there. Unlike the rest of the stores inside the Langley Park Plaza, McDonald's remains uniquely detached from the plaza and operates as its own standalone restaurant, despite still being located inside the Langley Park Plaza parking lot property and less than a few very small steps away from all the other stores inside the plaza. Also, the Peoples Drug store was converted into a CVS Pharmacy store when CVS corporation bought the 490-store Peoples Drug chain in the mid-nineties. The old-fashioned University Liquor store that has been inside the Langley Park Plaza for roughly five decades, is still operating in the Langley Park Plaza today. There is also a Rainbow Clothing & Apparel Store, New York Factory Outlet, Dollar Store, Home Jewelers Store, Family Furniture Discount Store, Payless Shoe Source Store, Shoe Depot Store, and Hunan Hut Chinese Carryout Restaurant, in addition to the stores mentioned earlier in this section.
 In recent years, the Langley Park Plaza has become a shopping destination for many recent immigrants, especially those from Central America. An attraction in the Langley Park Plaza is the fountain, nestled in a section of the mall, where recent immigrants take photos to show their families and friends at home that they have arrived in the United States. The fountain and interior hallway that surrounds it, that are currently inside Langley Park Plaza, did not actually exist until around 1996 when Langley Park Plaza went through major renovations to make the strip mall more modernized, right before the Toys R' Us Store opened in late November, 1996. During that time, Langley Park Plaza also got a brand new red exterior design on the outside of its brand new indoor entrance with the words, "Plaza", printed in white print. Langley Park Plaza was originally just an outdoor strip mall with various shops/stores and restaurants operating next to each other with no interior entrance connecting them. Even now, Langley Park Plaza remains primarily as an outdoor strip mall with nearly all stores having only their own entrances without connecting to other stores/restaurant operating within the strip mall, only with the exception having a main entrance with an interior fountain and Dollar Store.

 The other major shopping center that serves the Langley Park neighborhood at the intersection of University Boulevard and New Hampshire Avenue, is known as the Langley Park Shopping Center. Its volume is 135,000 square feet (12,500 square meters). Currently, its two main tenants are a Rite Aid Pharmacy Store and Woodland's Pure Vegetarian Indian restaurant. The shopping center initially opened in August 1951, when a Food Fair supermarket opened; it was later converted to an Acme, then Grand Union. This center was home to a Drug Fair, Hot Shoppes fast food restaurant, and Weile's Ice Cream Parlor, a Kresge Co. Store, and the 1,000-seat Langley Theater, which opened in March 1952.  The Langley Theater was eventually upgraded to a multi-screen theater in 1985, before eventually closing in the mid-1990s when the owner, K/B Theaters, went out of business. The spot of the Langley Theater was eventually taken over by a new Woodland's Pure Vegetarian Indian Restaurant and Subzi Mandi Indian Grocery Store which opened in March, 1998 in the Langley Park Shopping Center. Also, the Rite Aid Pharmacy Store, which sold GNC products, opened inside the Langley Park Shopping Center around late 1995, taking over the former Kresge Co. Store's spot. A Taco Bell Fast Food Restaurant also opened in the Langley Park Shopping Center in the spring of 1998, taking over the spot that the former Hot Shoppes Fast Food Restaurant has occupied in the Langley Park Shopping Center, for more than four decades. Right next to the Woodland's Pure Vegetarian Indian Restaurant, there used to be a Subzi Mandi Indian Grocery store, which closed around early 2010. There is a Gallo Clothing store, Dollar Store, Senor Coffee Shop, and Casa Blanca Bakery Shop that remain in operation still. The long-planned Takoma/Langley Crossroads Transit Center finally opened its doors on December 22, 2016 in the Langley Park Shopping Center parking lot, taking over most of the parking lot spaces and displacing Taco Bell's location by the shopping center. It mainly serves as a bus transfer point. At this transit center, people can get off one bus and transfer to another bus that gets them to their destination. After the Taco Bell was demolished, it relocated and opened its new store at the intersection of New Hampshire Avenue and Holton Lane in the adjacent neighborhood of Takoma Park, Maryland. Taco Bell's new location is right next to where the Aldi's Supermarket and Caribbean Market are both located.
 University Place is a small shopping center that serves the Langley Park neighborhood. It is located at the Intersection of University Boulevard and 15th Avenue. It consists of a China Palace Restaurant, La Chiquita Restaurant, Da Vita Dialysis Medical Store, Sweet Cash Pawn Store, a Laundromat/ Hair Salon Shop, and a Pho 75 Vietnamese Restaurant. A Sam & Raj Indian Jewelers Store also used to operate inside this particular strip mall up until around mid-2007 when it closed and got replaced by the Small Smiles Dental Clinic. The Small Smiles Dental Clinic also ended up eventually closing later and got replaced by a DaVita Dialysis Clinic. Also in the shopping center, the La Chiquita Restaurant is currently occupying the spot that used to house an Americana Grocery Latin American Supermarket for about fifteen years. The Americana Grocery Latin American Supermarket closed around 2016.
 At the northwest corner of the intersection of University Boulevard and Riggs Road, there is a very small shopping center that does not have a name. It consists of a Carolina Furniture Store, Western Union Bank, and Pep Boys Auto Repair Shop. The Carolina Furniture took over the spot of what used to be a "Mattress Discounters Store" around the summer of 2009.
 Then, last but not least, on the northeast corner of the intersection of University Boulevard and Riggs Road, there is another shopping center. This time, however; the shopping center is a little more jumbled up, meaning that it consists of stores that are in a wobbly line, rather than being organized in a single space. The shopping center consists of a Kenny's Caribbean Carryout Restaurant, Tire Shop, Exxon Mobil Gas Station, Krispy Kreme Donuts Store, Tiger Mart Convenience Store, 24- Hour Laundromat Shop, Family Dollar Store, Patel Brothers Indian Grocery Store, El Dorado Seafood Store. Domino's Pizza Restaurant, Burger King Fast Food Restaurant, Irene's Pupusas Fast Food Carryout Restaurant, and a Hyattsville Convenience Store. The Family Dollar store is currently occupying th space that used to house a Foot Locker Store. The Foot Locker Store closed in early 2010, which is when Family Dollar took over/opened.

Apartment complexes 
As mentioned earlier in the article, many of the apartment complexes in the Langley Park, MD neighborhood were built in the mid 1920s and early 1940s. It consists of quite a few different apartment complexes. 
 Campus Gardens Apartments (formerly known as, "Isabella Gardens Apartments" prior to 2006, when the apartment complex was renamed as, "Campus Gardens", when new management took over), located at the intersections of University Boulevard to the south, Phelps Road to the east, and Riggs Road to the west.
 University Gardens Apartments, located at the intersections of Riggs Road to the east, 15th Avenue to the west, and Kanawha Street/ Jasmine Terrace to the south
 The Marylander Condominiums, located slightly north of the Campus Gardens Apartments   at the intersection of Riggs Road and Keokee Street
 Serene Townhouse Village, located north of the intersection of Riggs Road and Jasmine Terrace, right across from the University Gardens Apartments
 Bedford Station Apartments, located at the intersections of University Boulevard to the south, 15th Avenue to the east, 14th Avenue to the west, and Kanawha Street to the north.
 The Villas at Langley Apartments, located on 15th Ave. north of Kanawha Street and south of Merrimac Drive, surrounding the Casa de Maryland mansion.
 Liberty Place Apartments, located at the intersection of University Boulevard and 14th Avenue
 Langley Terrace Apartments, located at the intersections of 14th Avenue, Langley Way, and Merrimac Drive, behind Langley Park Plaza
 Hampshire Village Apartments, located at the intersection of New Hampshire and Merrimac Drive
 Langley Gardens Apartments, located at the intersections of New Hampshire Avenue, Lebanon Street, and University Boulevard; This apartment complex used to serve as the Langley Park bus terminal for Montgomery County Ride-On bus routes 15, 16, 17, and 18 until the Takoma Langley Crossroads Center opened in December, 2015.
 University Landing Apartments, located at the intersection of University Boulevard and Merrimac Drive, right next to the Prince Georges/ Montgomery County Line, where the neighborhoods of Langley Park and Silver Spring meet; WMATA's F8 Metrobus Route used to have its terminus at University Boulevard & Merrimac Drive (Langley Park), located right inside the roadway of this particular apartment complex from December 3, 1978, when it was first created as a brand new WMATA Metrobus Route, all the way up until December, 2016 when the Takoma-Langley Crossroads Transit Center opened. As of this date, Wmata's route F8 began terminating at the Takoma Langley Crossroads Center instead. 
 Victoria Station Apartments, located slightly north of the intersection of New Hampshire Avenue and Merrimac Drive 
 Suburban Hill Apartments, located at the intersections of New Hampshire Avenue, Ruatan street, and Quebec Terrace, directly south of the Northwest Branch Anacostia Trail, bordering Adelphi and Silver Spring.
 Quebec Arms Apartments, located on the northern side of the intersection of 14th Avenue and Merrimac Drive

Education
The Prince George's County Public Schools (PGCPS) operates public schools. Langley Park-McCormick Elementary School is located in Langley Park. It had 679 students circa March 2013, with all but 12 living in Langley Park. In 2007 the school had 435 students. That year about 90% of the students at earlier grades were identified as learning English as a second language, and 370 students in all grade levels were Hispanic or Latino. Langley Park-McCormick entered into the Title I program due to the low income statuses of many of its students. Amy Stout became the principal in 2008 as former principal Sandra Jimenez, who started at Langley Park circa 2002, became the principal of Buck Lodge Middle School.

In 1987 the 611 students originated from 33 countries, with about 50% being born outside the United States; Central American and South American-born students made up the majority of that group. That year the students altogether spoke 17 languages.  95% of the students were Hispanic/Latino. In 2001, there were 750 students, with about 33% of them being in the "English for Speakers of Other Languages" (ESOL) program, and over 90% qualifying for free or reduced lunches. In 2001 it had five bilingual employees.

Other schools educating significant numbers of Langley Park students include Mary Harris “Mother” Jones Elementary School in Adelphi, Cool Spring Elementary School in Adelphi, Buck Lodge Middle School in Adelphi, and High Point High School in Beltsville. In 2013 the percentages of those schools' students living in Langley Park were 82%, 72%, 32%, and 23%. In the 2012–2013 school year 2,669 Langley Park students attended Langley Park-McCormick, Jones, Cool Spring, Buck Lodge, and High Point; making up 92% of the public school students in the community; while 220 Langley Park students attended 52 other PGCPS Schools.  Langley Park-McCormick, Adelphi, and Cool Spring elementaries had percentages of Hispanic students and students with free/reduced lunches higher than the average for PGCPS; Adelphi and Cool Springs each had over 56% of their students being Hispanic/Latino and about 50% being on free/reduced lunches.

Sections of the CDP north of Route 193 are assigned to Langley Park-McCormick, Jones, and Cool Spring; a section of the CDP south of Route 193 is zoned to Carole Highlands Elementary School. Carole Highlands has a Takoma Park postal address but is within the Langley Park CDP boundaries. As of the 1990 US Census and the 2000 US Census, Carole Highlands Elementary, as well as all of the areas south of Route 193, was in the Chillum CDP. All of Langley Park CDP is served by Buck Lodge Middle and High Point High.

In the 2011–12 school year 36% of 9th grade students from Langley Park, who attended High Point, did not go to school for at least 20 days per school year compared to 29% district average for 9th graders and 10% district average for 7th and 8th graders; the Langley Park 7th and 8th graders truancy rate was the same as the district average. Scott, et al. stated in a 2014 paper published by think tank The Urban Institute that a possible reason was that start time of High Point was the same as that of Buck Lodge Middle School even though the high school's distance from Langley Park was  longer than that of the middle school.

Recreation
Every year, Langley Park Day is held at Langley Park-McCormick Elementary. It has festivities as well as health screenings. It started in 1999. The school, Action Langley Park, the Prince George's County Department of Parks and Recreation, and the Maryland-National Capital Park and Planning Commission sponsors Langley Park Day.

In literature
Langley Park of the early 1960s is featured in the short story "Blue Divisions" by Cuban-American author Alfredo Franco.

References
Scott, Molly M., Graham MacDonald, and Juan Collazos (The Urban Institute); Ben Levinger (Prince George’s County Public Schools); Eliza Leighton and Jamila Ball (CASA de Maryland). "From Cradle to Career: The Multiple Challenges Facing Immigrant Families in Langley Park Promise Neighborhood." The Urban Institute, June 23, 2014. Abstract.

Notes

Further reading
 "Langley Park-College Park-Greenbelt Approved Master Plan (October 1989) and Adopted Sectional Map Amendment." Maryland-National Capital Park and Planning Commission, May 1990. Read online.

External links

 Maryland's International Corridor
 Chillum-Adelphi Volunteer Fire Department
 M-NCPPC Takoma / Langley Crossroads Project (retrieved Sep 6, 2008)

 
African-American history of Montgomery County, Maryland
Asian-American culture in Maryland
Caribbean-American culture in Maryland
Census-designated places in Maryland
Census-designated places in Prince George's County, Maryland
Ethnic enclaves in Maryland
Guatemalan-American culture
Hispanic and Latino American culture in Maryland
Historic Jewish communities in the United States
Salvadoran-American culture
Washington metropolitan area